This is a list of governors, etc. of the part of the Samoan Islands (now comprising American Samoa) under United States administration since 1900.

From 1900 to 1978 governors were appointed by the Federal government of the United States. Since that time they have been elected for 4-year terms by the people of American Samoa.

History
When the Department of the Interior sent four governors in a three year period, local Samoans began advocating for choosing their own governors. In the late 1940s, a Navy Governor, as well as an Interior Governor, had expressed their beliefs that High Orator Chief Tuiasosopo would be a suitable governor. In 1956, President Dwight D. Eisenhower appointed Peter Tali Coleman as Governor of American Samoa, the first person of Samoan descent to occupy that role. Coleman, a member of the Republican Party, was a U.S. Army officer with a law degree from Georgetown University. After his presidential appointment, local residents became increasingly aware that Samoans can do the job just as good as the federal government, which until now had appointed governors to the islands. Soon local lawmakers such as Governor Owen Aspinall and H. Rex Lee favored the idea of locals being elected governors. On the other side was Governor John Morse Haydon, who openly opposed the idea. An administrative judge criticized Haydon and following a Pago Pago hearing, the Department of the Interior began distancing itself from Haydon and soon replaced him with a new governor. The concept of an elected governor was proposed with Senate Bill 20 and a Gubernatorial Commission was created in order to consider ways to implement the concept of electing governors.

In a 1977 article from the New York Times, it describes how opposition to an appointed Governor began with the appointment of Earl B. Ruth. Within eighteen months, the congressman from North Carolina had removed several Samoans in administrative posts, who had been appointed by former Republican Governor John Morse Haydon. Governor Ruth was soon recalled to Washington, DC and was later quoted for having called Samoans "lazy, thieving liars." After having turned down the proposal to elect their own Governor in three plebiscites, American Samoans in a 1976 referendum overwhelmingly approved the measure in which allowed them to elect that official. The first popularly elected Governor was Republican Peter Tali Coleman that same year.

Republican Te'o J. Fuavai was one of the earliest proponents of the movement to elect Governors in American Samoa, as opposed to Governors being appointed by the federal government. Fuavai sponsored a resolution that proposed the Department of the Interior to permit elections.

Appointed governors (1900–1978)

Naval administrators (1900–1951)

Civilian governors (1951–1978)

Elected governors (1978–present)

Succession

References

American Samoa
Governor
Officials of American Samoa